Karolewo may refer to:

Karolewo, Bydgoszcz County in Kuyavian-Pomeranian Voivodeship (north-central Poland)
Karolewo, Grudziądz County in Kuyavian-Pomeranian Voivodeship (north-central Poland)
Karolewo, Sępólno County in Kuyavian-Pomeranian Voivodeship (north-central Poland)
Karolewo, Maków County in Masovian Voivodeship (east-central Poland)
Karolewo, Płock County in Masovian Voivodeship (east-central Poland)
Karolewo, Sierpc County in Masovian Voivodeship (east-central Poland)
Karolewo, Oborniki County in Greater Poland Voivodeship (west-central Poland)
Karolewo, Piła County in Greater Poland Voivodeship (west-central Poland)
Karolewo, Gmina Ostroróg in Greater Poland Voivodeship (west-central Poland)
Karolewo, Gmina Wronki in Greater Poland Voivodeship (west-central Poland)
Karolewo, Środa Wielkopolska County in Greater Poland Voivodeship (west-central Poland)
Karolewo, Złotów County in Greater Poland Voivodeship (west-central Poland)
Karolewo, Lubusz Voivodeship (west Poland)
Karolewo, Gmina Chojnice in Pomeranian Voivodeship (north Poland)
Karolewo, Chojnice County in Pomeranian Voivodeship (north Poland)
Karolewo, Kwidzyn County in Pomeranian Voivodeship (north Poland)
Karolewo, Starogard County in Pomeranian Voivodeship (north Poland)
Karolewo, Iława County in Warmian-Masurian Voivodeship (north Poland)
Karolewo, Kętrzyn County in Warmian-Masurian Voivodeship (north Poland)